Caroline Powell (born 29 June 1994) is a British skier, ski instructor, sighted guide and Paralympian.

Life
Powell was born in 1994 and was skiing by the age of two. She first appeared for the British ski team at Champery, Les Crosets in January 2010. She is a qualified ski instructor and coach.

At the 2014 Winter Paralympic Games, as guide for visually impaired skier Jade Etherington, she won silver medals in the women's downhill, women's slalom and women's combined skiing events, as well as winning a bronze medal in the women's super-G.

After winning a silver medal in the Super-G, visually impaired event on 14 March 2014, she and Jade Etherington became Great Britain's most successful female Winter Paralympians, and the first Britons to win four medals at one Paralympics.

References

External links
Caroline Powell's master class

Living people
British female alpine skiers
Alpine skiers at the 2014 Winter Paralympics
1994 births
Sportspeople from Basildon
Paralympic alpine skiers of Great Britain
Paralympic silver medalists for Great Britain
Paralympic sighted guides
Paralympic bronze medalists for Great Britain
Medalists at the 2014 Winter Paralympics
Paralympic medalists in alpine skiing